William Arthur Williams (29 December 1905 – 4 November 1973) was a Welsh dual-code international rugby union, and professional rugby league footballer who played in the 1920s and 1930s.

Background
Billy Williams was born in Crumlin, Monmouthshire, and he died aged 67 in Manchester, Lancashire, England.

Rugby career
Williams first came to note as a rugby player when he represented rugby union team Cross Keys. By the time he was selected for international duty, he was playing for unfashionable lower league team Crumlin. The fact that Williams was, and still is, the only player to be selected for international duty directly from the club is an indicator to the talent he showed as a flanker. Williams played in four union internationals, all of them part of the 1927 Five Nations Championship. His first encounter was against England, played away at Twickenham. The game ended with a 9-11 loss, and despite the result Williams was re-selected for the next three games. Wales ended the Championship with just one win, a home match against France. It is unknown if Williams would have been selected the next season as in 1927 he switched to professional league club Salford. By switching to a professional club, Williams was not only banned from playing union again for life, but also had his union international cap withheld.

Williams played his first league game for Salford on 15 October 1927, and won three Championship and one Challenge Cup winners medals with the club over his career. On 15 January 1930, Williams was selected for the Great Britain team, to face a touring Australia side. Just three days later he won his first Wales league cap, in a match against the same touring Australians at Wembley. He won two more caps for Wales, a 1932 encounter with England and a 1933 match against Australia. In-between his Welsh caps, Williams also toured Australia with Great Britain in 1932. He played in 15 games of the tour and one Test against Australia.

Williams died in Manchester in 1973; in 1975 his Wales rugby union cap was awarded to him posthumously under an 'amnesty'.

Les Diables Rouges
Billy Williams was one of the players who successfully toured in France with Salford in 1934, during which the Salford team earned the name "Les Diables Rouges", the seventeen players were; Joe Bradbury, Bob Brown, Aubrey Casewell, Paddy Dalton, Bert Day, Cliff Evans, Jack Feetham, George Harris, Barney Hudson, Emlyn Jenkins, Alf Middleton, Sammy Miller, Harold Osbaldestin, Les Pearson, Gus Risman, Billy Watkins, and Billy Williams.

Challenge Cup Final appearances
Billy Watkins played left-, i.e. number 8, in Salford's 7-4 victory over Barrow in the 1938 Challenge Cup Final at Wembley Stadium, London, in front of a crowd of 51,243.

County Cup Final appearances
About Billy Williams' time, there was Salford's 2-15 defeat by Warrington in the 1929 Lancashire Cup Final at Central Park, Wigan on Saturday 23 November 1929, the 10-8 victory over Swinton in the 1931 Lancashire Cup Final at The Cliff, Broughton, Salford on Saturday 21 November 1931, the 21-12 victory over Wigan in the 1934 Lancashire Cup Final at Station Road, Swinton on Saturday 20 October 1934, the 15-7 victory over Wigan in the 1935 Lancashire Cup Final at Wilderspool Stadium, Warrington on Saturday 19 October 1935, the 5-2 victory over Wigan in the 1936 Lancashire Cup Final at Wilderspool Stadium, Warrington on Saturday 17 October 1936.

References

Bibliography
 
 

1905 births
1973 deaths
Cross Keys RFC players
Crumlin RFC players
Dual-code rugby internationals
Great Britain national rugby league team players
People from Crumlin, Caerphilly
Rugby union players from Caerphilly County Borough
Rugby league players from Caerphilly County Borough
Rugby league props
Rugby league second-rows
Rugby union flankers
Rugby union players from Crumlin
Salford Red Devils captains
Salford Red Devils players
Wales international rugby union players
Wales national rugby league team players
Welsh rugby league players
Welsh rugby union players